The 1976 Boston University Terriers football team was an American football team that represented Boston University as a member of the Yankee Conference during the 1976 NCAA Division II football season. In their fourth season under head coach Paul Kemp, the Terriers compiled a 3–7 record (2–3 against conference opponents), finished in a four-way tie for third/last place in the conference, and were outscored by a total of 225 to 150.

Schedule

References

Boston University
Boston University Terriers football seasons
Boston University Terriers football